Angelika Kirchschlager (born 24 November 1965, Salzburg) is an Austrian mezzo-soprano opera and lieder singer.

Career
Kirchschlager began her musical training at the Mozarteum in Salzburg, where she studied percussion and piano. In 1984, she went to the Vienna Music Academy, where she studied with Gerhard Kahry and Walter Berry. Her first engagements were at the Wiener Kammeroper and the Graz Opera. Kirchschlager won 1st Prize together with Morenike Fadayomi in Wien's international Operncafé HArtauer-COmpetition and third prize in the International Hans Gabor Belvedere Singing Competition both in 1991.  Her stage debut was in Graz in 1993 as Octavian (Der Rosenkavalier).  In 1993, she became a member of the Vienna State Opera, and made her debut there as Cherubino (The Marriage of Figaro). Also in 1993, she was awarded the Mozartinterpretationspreis of the Mozart Society of Vienna.

In 2002, Kirchschlager sang the role of Sophie in the world première of Nicholas Maw's opera Sophie's Choice at the Royal Opera House in London, the American premiere of the revised version of the opera at the Washington Opera, and the Austrian premiere at Volksoper Wien.  She is a regular guest of the annual Lieder festival Schubertiade Schwarzenberg in Vorarlberg, Austria.  Her regular collaborators include Helmut Deutsch and Simon Keenlyside.

Kirchschlager resides in Vienna.  She has a son, Felix, from her marriage to the baritone Hans Peter Kammerer.  Kirchschlager and Kammerer are currently separated.

Roles

Annio (La clemenza di Tito)
Cherubino (Le nozze di Figaro)
The Composer (Ariadne auf Naxos)
Dorabella (Così fan tutte)
Idamante (Idomeneo)
Lauretta (Gianni Schicchi)
Mélisande (Pelléas et Mélisande)
Niklausse/Muse (The Tales of Hoffmann)
Octavian (Der Rosenkavalier)
Orlofsky (Die Fledermaus)
Rosina (Il barbiere di Siviglia)
Sesto (Giulio Cesare)
Silla (Palestrina)
Sophie (Sophie's Choice by Nicholas Maw)
Valencienne (Die lustige Witwe)
Zerlina (Don Giovanni)
Hänsel (Hänsel und Gretel)
Carmen (Carmen)
Ariodante (Ariodante)
Clairon (Capriccio)
Jenny (Aufstieg und Fall der Stadt Mahagonny)

References

Further reading

External links

Angelika Kirchschlager (Mezzo-soprano) on Bach Cantatas Website

1966 births
Living people
Musicians from Salzburg
Austrian operatic mezzo-sopranos
Mozarteum University Salzburg alumni
Grammy Award winners
20th-century Austrian women opera singers
21st-century Austrian women opera singers
Academic staff of the University of Music and Performing Arts Graz
University of Music and Performing Arts Vienna alumni